Verdal is a municipality in Trøndelag county, Norway. It is part of the Innherad region. The administrative centre of the municipality is the town of Verdalsøra. Some villages in the municipality include Forbregd/Lein, Lysthaugen, Stiklestad, Trones, Vera, Vinne, and Vuku.

The  municipality is the 53rd largest by area out of the 356 municipalities in Norway. Verdal is the 81st most populous municipality in Norway with a population of 14,955.

General information

The municipality of Værdalen was established on 1 January 1838 (see formannskapsdistrikt law). It is one of very few municipalities in Norway with unchanged borders since that date, although the spelling of the name was modified to Verdal.  On 1 January 2018, the municipality switched from the old Nord-Trøndelag county to the new Trøndelag county.

Name
The municipality (originally the parish) is named after the Verdalen valley. The first element is the genitive case of the river name  (now called Verdalselva). The meaning of the river name is probably "the quiet one". The name was historically spelled Værdalen.

Coat of arms
The coat of arms was granted on 15 December 1972. The official blazon is "Gules, a cross cleché Or". This means the arms have a red field (background) and the charge is a cross with a cleché design. The cross has a tincture of Or which means it is commonly colored yellow, but if it is made out of metal, then gold is used. The design is based on a cross shown in a large painting in the Nidaros Cathedral in Trondheim, in which the death of King Olav Haraldsson (Saint Olaf) is shown. He died in the Battle of Stiklestad, the site of which is in Verdal municipality. In the painting, he holds a shield with this cross design. To commemorate the battle, the cross was taken as arms for the municipality. The arms were designed by Hallvard Trætteberg. The municipal flag has the same design as the coat of arms.

Churches
The Church of Norway has four parishes within the municipality of Verdal. It is part of the Sør-Innherad prosti (deanery) in the Diocese of Nidaros.

History

Battle of Stiklestad

The most famous battle in Norwegian history, the Battle of Stiklestad, took place at Stiklestad in Verdal in the year 1030. The Stiklestad Church was built afterwards at the place where King Olav Haraldsson, later redesigned as St. Olaf, died during the battle. Olavsstøtta, a memorial pillar dedicated to St. Olaf,  was erected in 1807 to commemorate the Battle of Stiklestad.

Verdalsraset
Early on the night of 19 May 1893, the most deadly landslide in modern Norwegian history, known as Verdalsraset, took place in Verdal. It killed 116 people and at least 500 animals when approximately 100 farms were swept away. A wet winter and several spring floods in the river made the quick clay under the topsoil in a large area of the valley turn into a fluid.

Culture

Råning
This culture is known for young people interested in cars, spending most of their time improving, enhancing, and styling their cars, and then driving them for display on a particular route around the town centre. This is not only positive, as they do show some general disregard for common laws and regulations. People living in the town center are at times bothered by noise, usually music being played at high volumes from their cars.

Stiklestad
Verdal is the location of the Stiklestad National Cultural Centre. The Saint Olav Drama appears here on an open stage every year in July. The play centers on events leading up to the Battle of Stiklestad.

Geography

Verdal is centered on the Verdal valley. The river Verdalselva runs through the valley into the Trondheimsfjord at Verdalsøra. The rivers Helgåa and Inna join at Vuku to form the Verdalselva. The lake Veresvatnet flows into the river Helgåa and the lake Innsvatnet flows into the river Inna. The large lake Leksdalsvatnet lies on the Verdal-Steinkjer border. The southern tip of the large Blåfjella–Skjækerfjella National Park lies in the northeastern part of Verdal. Rinnleiret is a beach area along the Levanger-Verdal border in the west.

Climate
Verdal is situated along the innermost part of Trondheimsfjord and has a humid continental climate (Dfb) with mild winters for this climate. Using the  winter threshold as in the original Köppen climate classification, Verdal has an oceanic climate (Cfb). The all-time high  was recorded in July 2018. The all-time low  was set in January 1987. The average date for first overnight freeze (below ) in autumn is October 6 (1981-2010 average).

Government
All municipalities in Norway, including Verdal, are responsible for primary education (through 10th grade), outpatient health services, senior citizen services, unemployment and other social services, zoning, economic development, and municipal roads. The municipality is governed by a municipal council of elected representatives, which in turn elect a mayor.  The municipality falls under the Trøndelag District Court and the Frostating Court of Appeal.

Municipal council
The municipal council of Verdal is made up of 35 representatives that are elected to four-year terms. The party breakdown of the council is as follows:

Mayors
The mayors of Verdal:

1838–1839: Eliseus Müller
1840–1841: Lars Steen
1842–1843: Christian Munch von Holst
1844–1849: Johannes Groth Monrad
1850–1861: Ole Hage
1862–1863: Andreas Steen
1864–1871: Wilhelm Christian Holst
1872–1875: Martin Daniel Müller (H)
1876–1881: Anton Bendix Monrad	
1882–1889: Peter Holst (V)
1890–1893: Andreas Tessem (V)
1893–1895: Martin Eggen (V)
1896–1901: Elling Reppe (V)
1902–1910: Ole Holan (V)
1911–1913: Bernhard Rostad (H)
1914–1916: Erik Veel (V)
1917–1919: Tommas Berg (V)
1920-1920: Ole Holan (V)
1921–1928: Tommas Berg (V)
1929–1934: Eliseus Müller (Bp)
1935–1939: Andreas Haugan (Ap)
1939–1940: Christian Nevermo (Ap)
1941–1945: Arne Vold (NS)
1945-1945: Georg Tromsdal (Ap)
1946–1959: Einar Musum (Ap)
1960–1963: Iver Skreden (Sp)
1963–1967: Johan Støa (Ap)
1968–1969: Klaus Stavø (Ap)
1969–1975: Karl Ydse (Ap)
1976–1991: Ola G. Tromsdal (Ap)
1992–1995: Kari Sundby (Sp)
1995-1999: Knut Einar Steinsli (Sp)
1999-2005: Gerd Janne Kristoffersen (Ap)
2005-2019: Bjørn Iversen (Ap)
2019–present: Pål Sverre Fikse (Sp)

Economy
Offshore industry (Aker Verdal) and agriculture are two of the most important parts of Verdal's economy. Despite its small size, Verdal is a municipality with great personality and cultural integrity. After several lottery grand prizes were received by some lucky inhabitants of Verdal, it is also known as one of the great "Lotto-bygds" of Norway (Small places with high a concentration of lottery wins in the national game of Lotto).

Transportation
European route E6 runs north and south through Verdalsøra, connecting the municipality with Steinkjer to the north and Levanger to the south. The Nordland Line also runs north and south through the municipality. There are two stations in Verdal: Verdal Station in Verdalsøra and Bergsgrav Station in Vinne.

Notable people 

 Johannes Brun (1832 in Verdal – 1890) a Norwegian stage actor
 Oluf Rygh (1833 in Verdal – 1899) a noted archaeologist, philologist and historian
 Olav Braarud (1885 in Verdal – 1969) operational engineer of Holmenkolbanen
 Sig Haugdahl (1891 in Verdal – 1970) an IMCA "Big Car" champion 1927–1932, promoted stock car racing in the USA
 Trygve Braarud (1903 in Verdal – 1985) a Norwegian botanist and academic
 Knut Getz Wold (1915 in Verdal – 1987) an economist, civil servant and governor of the Central Bank of Norway 1970–1985.
 Arnold Haukeland (1920 in Verdal – 1983) a Norwegian sculptor
 Asmund Bjørken (1933 in Verdal – 2018) a Norwegian musician who played the jazz and folk accordion and saxophone
 Vigdis Ystad (1942 in Verdal – 2019) a Norwegian literary historian and academic
 Nils Nordberg (born 1942 in Verdal) a crime writer, anthology editor and audio play director
 Hans Rotmo (born 1948), musician, published the first album sung in a Norwegian dialect
 Bjørn Iversen (born 1953) a Norwegian politician, Mayor of Verdal since 2005
 Rune Rebellion (born 1965 in Verdal) stage name of Rune Grønn, a guitarist 
 Ingrid Storholmen (born 1976 in Verdal) a Norwegian poet, novelist and literary critic
 Gjermund Larsen (born 1981 in Verdal) a traditional folk musician (violin) and composer

Sport 
 Pål Benum (born 1935 in Verdal) an orthopediatrician and former long-distance runner, competed at 1964 Olympic Games
 Trond Viggo Toresen (born 1978 in Verdal) a footballer with over 250 club caps
 Even Barli (born 1991 in Verdal) a Norwegian goalkeeper for Ranheim with 234 caps.
 Jonas Svensson (born 1993 in Verdal) a footballer with over 270 club caps and 18 for Norway

See also
VKB

References

External links

Municipal fact sheet from Statistics Norway 
Stiklestad National Culture Centre Official Website
Battle of Stiklestad

 
Municipalities of Trøndelag
1838 establishments in Norway